Edvard Natvig (16 August 1907 – 6 November 1994) was a Norwegian decathlete. He represented Oslo Politis IL.

He finished tenth at the 1936 Summer Olympics in Berlin with 6,297 points, but never participated in other international events such as the European Championships. His result of 6,297 points (6,298 points with today's points table) was his career best result. He became Norwegian decathlon champion in 1934. In addition he won silver medals at the Norwegian championships in javelin throw in 1933, 1935 and 1938.

References

1907 births
1994 deaths
Norwegian decathletes
Athletes (track and field) at the 1936 Summer Olympics
Olympic athletes of Norway
Norwegian police officers